Francis Charles Synge   was an Anglican priest in the 20th century: an author, educator and senior leader.

Synge was educated at King's School, BrutonSelwyn College, Cambridge and Wells Theological College. He was ordained deacon in 1927, and priest in 1928. After a curacy at St Andrew, Taunton he went out to be Chaplain to the South African Railways Mission in Southern Rhodesia. He was as Rector of Tostock from 1933 to 1935; and then Principal of Queen's College, Birmingham from 1935 to 1939. He was Domestic Chaplain to the Bishop of London from 1939;  and a Deputy Priest to the King from 1940. He was the Principal of Christ's College, Christchurch from 1959 to 1964; and Archdeacon of Kroonstad from 1965 to  1968.

Books
 St. Paul's Epistle to the Ephesians: A theological commentary (1941)
 Introduction to and commentary on Philippians and Colossians (1951)
 Hebrews and the Scriptures (1956)

References

 

St Mark's Cathedral, George, Western Cape

Deans of George
Archdeacons of Kroonstad
Alumni of Selwyn College, Cambridge
20th-century Anglican priests
Alumni of Wells Theological College
St Paul's College, Grahamstown alumni
People educated at King's School, Bruton